the smooth alligatorfish (Anoplagonus inermis), also known as the smooth poacher or the smooth sea-poacher,) is a fish in the family Agonidae. It was described by Albert Günther in 1860. It is a marine fish which dwells in temperate waters, and is known from the northern Pacific Ocean, including California, USA, and possibly Korea. It dwells at a depth range of 8–102 metres, usually around rocks. Males can reach a maximum total length of 15 centimetres.

The smooth alligatorfish is preyed upon by the Pacific halibut (Hippoglossus stenolepis). It is often caught by shrimp trawlers.

References

Snooth alligatorfish
Fish described in 1860
Taxa named by Albert Günther